Pablo César Cano García (born 4 October 1989) is a Mexican professional boxer. He held the WBA interim super lightweight title in 2012, and challenged once for the WBC super lightweight title in 2011 and once for the WBA welterweight title in 2012. As of November 2020, he is ranked as the world’s ninth best super lightweight by the Transnational Boxing Rankings Board.

Professional career
In June 2010, Pablo beat the veteran Óscar Leon to win the NABF super lightweight title.

WBC super lightweight championship
On 17 September 2011 Cano faced three-division titleholder Érik Morales for a vacant WBC super lightweight title, on the undercard of Victor Ortiz vs. Floyd Mayweather. Cano lost via technical knockout (TKO) in the tenth round to Erik Morales. He replaced hard-hitting Lucas Matthysse of Argentina, who withdrew with a viral infection that prevented him from training.

He also fought Paulie Malignaggi in what was supposed to be a title fight, however Cano missed weight. Cano dropped Malignaggi in the eleventh round. The fight ended with a disputed split decision in Malignaggi's favor.

Cano also faced Shane Mosley in Cancun, dropping a unanimous decision with all three scorecards being 115-113.

On 13 September 2018, Cano fought Ruslan Madiev. The fight started off fast, with both fighters exchanging a number of punches from the opening round. In the fifth round, Madiev caused a massive cut over Cano's left eye with a headbutt followed by a punch. Huge amounts of blood made the referee stop the fight, which led to a technical decision victory for Cano, who was up 49-47 on all three scorecards at the time.

In his next fight, Pablo Cesar Cano fought former champion Jorge Linares who moved up from lightweight. Cano shocked the boxing world by dominating Linares, dropping him three times in the first round before the judge would see that Linares, despite beating the count could not take any more punishment from Cano. Linares seemed like he could not take any of Cano's punches and seemed oversized by Cano.

After the biggest win of his career, Cano faced Roberto Ortiz on November 16, 2019. Ortiz started off strong and managed to drop Cano in the first round. After the first round ended, it seemed like that was the only time Ortiz had any chance at winning the fight, since from the start of the second round Cano took over the fight. Cano would end up dominating the round and dropping Ortiz twice, before the referee had seen enough and called the fight to a stop.

Professional boxing record

{|class="wikitable" style="text-align:center
|-
!
!Result
!Record
!Opponent
!Type
!Round, time
!Date
!Location
!Notes
|-
|43
|Loss
|33–8–1 
|align=left|Danielito Zorrilla
|KO
|2 (10), 
|14 Sep 2021
|style="text-align:left;"| 
|
|-
|42
|Win
|33–7–1 
|align=left|Roberto Ortiz
|TKO
|2 (10), 
|16 Nov 2019
|style="text-align:left;"|
|align=left|
|- align=center
|41
|Win
|32–7–1 
|align=left|Jorge Linares
|TKO
|1 (12), 
|18 Jan 2019
|style="text-align:left;"|
|align=left|
|- align=center
|40
|Win
|31–7–1 
|align=left|Ruslan Madiev
|TD
|5 (10), 
|13 Sep 2018
|style="text-align:left;"|
|align=left|
|- align=center
|39
|Loss
|30–7–1 
|align=left|Marcelino Lopez
|TKO
|2 (10), 
|13 Oct 2017
|style="text-align:left;"|
|align=left|
|- align=center
|38
|Loss
|30–6–1 
|align=left|Fidel Maldonado
|SD
|10
|17 Jun 2017
|style="text-align:left;"|
|align=left|
|- align=center
|37
|Win
|30–5–1 
|align=left|Mauricio Herrera
|SD
|10
|18 Nov 2016
|style="text-align:left;"|
|align=left|
|- align=center
|36
|Loss
|29–5–1 
|align=left|Alan Sanchez
|SD
|10
|6 May 2016
|align=left|
|align=left|
|- align=center
|35
|Win
|29–4–1 
|align=left|Silverio Ortiz
|UD
|10
|19 Dec 2015
|align=left|
|align=left|
|- align=center
|34
|style="background:#DDD"|
|28–4–1 
|align=left|Juan Carlos Abreu
|MD
|10
|27 Feb 2015
|align=left|
|align=left|
|- align=center
|33
|Win
|28–4–1 ||align=left|Jorge Silva
|KO
|1 (10), 
|7 Feb 2015
|align=left|
|align=left|
|- align=center
|32
|Loss
|27–4–1 
|align=left|Fernando Angulo
|TKO
|9 (10), 
|1 Mar 2014
|align=left|
|align=left|
|- align=center
|31
|Win
|27–3–1 
|align=left|Ashley Theophane
|SD
|10
|14 Sep 2013
|align=left|
|align=left|
|- align=center
|30
|Loss
|26–3–1 
|align=left|Shane Mosley
|UD
|12
|18 May 2013
|align=left|
|align=left|
|- align=center
|29
|Loss
|26–2–1
|align=left|Paulie Malignaggi
|SD
|12
|20 Oct 2012
|align=left|
|align=left|
|- align=center
|28
|Win
|26–1–1 
|align=left|Johan Pérez
|TD
|7 (12), 
|21 Jul 2012
|align=left|
|align=left|
|- align=center
|27
|Win
|25–1–1 
|align=left|Fidel Muñoz
|KO
|9 (10), 
|26 May 2012
|align=left|
|align=left|
|- align=center
|26
|Win
|24–1–1 
|align=left|Francisco Contreras
|RTD
|6 (10), 
|18 Feb 2012
|align=left|
|align=left|
|- align=center
|25
|Loss
|23–1–1 
|align=left|Érik Morales
|RTD
|10 (12), 
|17 Sep 2011
|align=left|
|align=left|
|- align=center
|24
|Win
|23–0–1 
|align=left|Mario Hermosillo
|TKO
|5 (10)
|27 Aug 2011
|align=left|
|align=left|
|- align=center
|23
|Win
|22–0–1 
|align=left|Pablo Lugo
|TKO
|7 (10), 
|25 Jun 2011
|align=left|
|align=left|
|- align=center
|22
|Win
|21–0–1 
|align=left|Jorge Romero
|TKO
|4 (10), 
|19 Feb 2011
|align=left|
|align=left|
|- align=center
|21
|Win
|20–0–1 
|align=left|Oscar León
|SD
|10
|25 Jun 2010
|align=left|
|align=left|
|- align=center
|20
|Win
|19–0–1 
| align=left|Marcos Valdez
|KO
|1 (8), 
|20 Feb 2010
|align=left|
|align=left|
|- align=center
|19
|Win
|18–0–1
|align=left|Tomas Sierra
|KO
|1 (8)
|12 Dec 2009
|align=left|
|align=left|
|- align=center
|18
|Win
|17–0–1 
|align=left|Fabian Marimon
|SD
|8
|20 Jun 2009
|align=left|
|align=left|
|- align=center
|17
|Win
|16–0–1 
|align=left|Jorge Luis Lopez
|TKO
|4 (6), 
|25 Apr 2009
|align=left|
|align=left|
|- align=center
|6
|Win
|15–0–1 
| align=left|Ernesto Gonzalez
|UD
|8
|21 Feb 2009
|align=left|
|align=left|
|- align=center
|15
|Win
|14–0–1 
|align=left|Luis Rey Campoa
|UD
|8
|31 Jan 2009
|align=left|
|align=left|
|- align=center
|14
|Win
|13–0–1 
|align=left|Rodrigo Martinez
|TKO
|2 (8)
|20 Sep 2008
|align=left|
|align=left|
|- align=center
|13
|Win
|12–0–1 
|align=left|Jose Luis Rodriguez
|TKO
|2 (8)
|31 Jul 2008
|align=left|
|align=left|
|- align=center
|12
|Win
|11–0–1 
|align=left|Carlos Mario Sanchez 
|TKO
|2 (4)
|31 May 2008
|align=left|
|align=left|
|- align=center
|11
|Win
|10–0–1 
|align=left|Mario Rodriguez 
|KO
|3 (6)
|26 Apr 2008
|align=left|
|align=left|
|- align=center
|10
|Win
|9–0–1
|align=left|Alejandro Espindola
|TKO
|1 (6)
|21 Dec 2007
|align=left|
|align=left|
|- align=center
|9
|Win
|8–0–1 
|align=left|Jesus Cruz Bibiano
|TKO
|2 (4)
|2 Aug 2007
|align=left|
|align=left|
|- align=center
|8
|Win
|7–0–1 
|align=left|Israel Almarez
|KO
|2 (4)
|30 Jun 2007
|align=left|
|align=left|
|- align=center
|7
|Win
|6–0–1 
|align=left|Osvaldo Ortiz
|TKO
|1 (6)
|29 Mar 2007
|align=left|
|align=left|
|- align=center
|6
|Win
|5–0–1
|align=left|Adolfo Cruz 
|TKO
|1 (4)
|22 Dec 2006
|align=left|
|align=left|
|- align=center
|5
|Win
|4–0–1
|align=left|Angel Licea
|KO
|1 (6)
|8 Dec 2006
|align=left|
|align=left|
|- align=center
|4
|Win
|3–0–1 
|align=left|Candelario Torres 
|UD
|4
|27 Oct 2006
|align=left|
|
|- align=center
|3
|Draw
|2–0–1
|align=left|Israel Ramirez 
|PTS
|4
|15 Jun 2006
|align=left|
|align=left|
|- align=center
|2
|Win
|2–0 
|align=left|Gilbert Aguilar
|PTS
|4
|26 Apr 2006
|align=left|
|align=left|
|- align=center
|1
|Win
|1–0 
|align=left|Miguel Angel Merino
|KO
|1 (4)
|7 Mar 2006
|align=left|
|align=left|

See also
List of Mexican boxing world champions
List of light welterweight boxing champions
List of WBA world champions
List of current NABF Champions

References

External links
 

People from Tlalnepantla de Baz
Boxers from the State of Mexico
World boxing champions
World light-welterweight boxing champions
World Boxing Association champions
Light-welterweight boxers
Lightweight boxers
1989 births
Living people
Mexican male boxers